Joaquim Adão Lungieki João (born 14 July 1992) is a Swiss-born Angolan footballer who plays for Petro de Luanda as a defensive midfielder.

Club career
Adão was loaned to Scottish Premiership club Heart of Midlothian in January 2018.

International career
Adão played his first international game for Angola on 5 March 2014, in a 1–1 draw against Mozambique. He was part of the starting lineup and played the entire match.

References

External links
 
 
 

1992 births
People from Fribourg
Swiss people of Angolan descent
Swiss sportspeople of African descent
Living people
Swiss men's footballers
Angolan footballers
Angola international footballers
Association football midfielders
FC Sion players
FC Chiasso players
Progresso Associação do Sambizanga players
Kabuscorp S.C.P. players
Heart of Midlothian F.C. players
Atlético Petróleos de Luanda players
Swiss 1. Liga (football) players
Swiss Super League players
Swiss Challenge League players
Swiss Promotion League players
Girabola players
Scottish Professional Football League players
Angolan expatriate footballers
Expatriate footballers in Scotland
Angolan expatriate sportspeople in Scotland
Sportspeople from the canton of Fribourg